Sviatoslav Olgovich (died February 14, 1164) was the Prince of Novgorod (1136–1138); Novgorod-Seversky (1139); Belgorod Kievsky (1141–1154); and Chernigov (1154–1164). He was the son of Oleg Sviatoslavich, Prince of Chernigov with an unnamed daughter of Asaduk, Khan of Khumans.

After the death of their older brother, Vsevolod II, Sviatoslav and his brother Igor were driven out of Kiev by Iziaslav Mstislavich. Sviatoslav escaped, but Igor was captured and eventually killed in 1147. Sviatoslav fled to Chernigov but was ordered to relinquish his city, Novgorod-Seversky, to his cousins, Iziaslav Davidovich and Vladimir Davidovich. With the assistance of his ally, Yuri Dolgoruki, and his father-in-law, Aepa Khan, Sviatoslav began a war against his cousins, but was forced to flee to Karachev. There on January 16, 1147, Sviatoslav defeated the Davidovichi brothers.

Family

In 1108, Sviatoslav married a Cuman princess, daughter of Aepa Khan, who gave him a daughter and a son, Oleg. In 1136 Svyatoslav married a second time, to a woman of Novgorod, who bore his famous son, Igor Sviatoslavich.

References

 Dimnik, Martin. The Dynasty of Chernigov, 1146-1246, 2000

1164 deaths
12th-century princes in Kievan Rus'
Olgovichi family
Year of birth unknown